Nicole Renée is an album by American R&B musician and former Teen Summit host Nicole Renée, released  via Atlantic Records. The album failed to chart in the United States; however, its lead single, "Strawberry", peaked at #83 on the Billboard Hot 100.

Track listing
All tracks written and produced by Nicole Renée, except where noted.

Reception

References

1998 debut albums
Albums produced by Craig Kallman
Atlantic Records albums
Contemporary R&B albums by American artists